Milton Stanley Whiting (11 March 1922 – 5 July 2010) was an Australian politician.

He was born in Merbein to horticulturist Stanley Joshua Whiting and Isobel Maude Venville. He attended Mildura High School and worked on his father's property from 1937 to 1941, when he enlisted in the Royal Australian Air Force. He was a wireless operator and air gunner before being captured, spending 1942 to 1945 as a prisoner of war in Germany. On his return he was part of the soldier settlement scheme and became a farmer of citrus and dried fruit at Robinvale in 1947. On 22 May, 1948 he married Veda Rose Spiller, with whom he had four children. In 1950, he was the founding secretary of the Robinvale branch of the Country Party. He was elected to the Victorian Legislative Assembly in 1962 as the member for Mildura, serving as a backbencher until his retirement in 1988.

References

1922 births
2010 deaths
National Party of Australia members of the Parliament of Victoria
Members of the Victorian Legislative Assembly
Royal Australian Air Force personnel of World War II
Royal Australian Air Force airmen
Australian prisoners of war
World War II prisoners of war held by Germany